The 1862 City of Auckland West by-election was a by-election held  on 14 June 1862 in the  electorate during the 3rd New Zealand Parliament. It was then a two-member electorate, with the other member being John Williamson

The by-election was caused by the resignation of the incumbent, Josiah Firth, on 30 April 1862.

James Williamson of Remuera was declared elected unopposed, as he was the only candidate nominated.

References 

Auckland West 1862
1862 elections in New Zealand
July 1862 events
Politics of the Auckland Region